Alfréd Réth (1884–1966) was a Hungarian painter.
At the age of 19 he left for Italy, then in 1905 to Paris. Here he discovered the art of Cézanne and Hindu art. He became a member of the cubist movement.

References 

1884 births
1966 deaths
Artists from Budapest
20th-century Hungarian painters
Hungarian male painters
20th-century Hungarian male artists